VaccinateCA was a community-run website that tracks the availability of COVID-19 vaccines in California. It was created by a group of volunteers who call hospitals, pharmacies, and other health care providers daily to gather information about vaccine availability, eligibility, and appointment procedures. The website then publishes this information and allows users to search for vaccination sites by region, county, or within a set radius of their ZIP code.

References

COVID-19 pandemic in California
coronavirus pandemic